Khalifa Ababacar Diouf (born 24 March 1968) is a Senegalese former judoka. He competed in the men's heavyweight event at the 1996 Summer Olympics.

References

External links
 

1968 births
Living people
Senegalese male judoka
Olympic judoka of Senegal
Judoka at the 1996 Summer Olympics
Place of birth missing (living people)
20th-century Senegalese people
21st-century Senegalese people
African Games medalists in judo
Competitors at the 1991 All-Africa Games
Competitors at the 1995 All-Africa Games
African Games gold medalists for Senegal
African Games silver medalists for Senegal